Gandolfini is a surname. Notable people with the surname include:

 James Gandolfini (1961–2013), American actor
 Michael Gandolfini (born 1999), American actor

Italian-language surnames